Alice Pung  (born 1981) is an Australian writer, editor and lawyer. Her books include the memoirs Unpolished Gem (2006), Her Father's Daughter (2011) and the novel Laurinda (2014).

Pung is a practising solicitor. She has also worked as an art instructor, independent school teacher at primary and secondary schools and is Artist in Residence at Janet Clarke Hall at the University of Melbourne.

Life
Pung was born to ethnic Teochew Chinese parents from Cambodia. Fleeing the killing fields of the Khmer Rouge, her parents sought asylum in Australia in 1980. Pung was named Alice after the protagonist of Alice in Wonderland, because her father saw Australia as a wonderland. She was born in the suburb of Footscray in Melbourne and grew up in Braybrook.

Pung attended five Melbourne schools, including the  Catholic  junior  girls  school Christ the King College in Braybrook (now the  junior  girls campus of  Caroline Chisholm Catholic College), Penleigh and Essendon Grammar School  and  Mac.Robertson Girls' High School.  Pung studied law at the University of Melbourne and is a practising lawyer.

Writing career
Pung's first book, Unpolished Gem, won the 2007 Newcomer of the Year Award in the Australian Book Industry Awards. Her follow-up memoir, Her Father's Daughter, was published in 2011.

Her first book for young adults, Laurinda was published in 2014. It was adapted for an American audience in 2016, and a collection of high school students' stories inspired by the novel was published in 2016. Pung has also written the Marly books for the Our Australian Girl children's series.

Pung attended the International Writing Program at the University of Iowa as a Resident in 2009. She is a regular writer for The Monthly on topics such as race discrimination, class, cultural stereotypes, and experiences of living in Melbourne, Victoria.

In November 2020 the Melbourne Theatre Company announced that it will adapt Pung's novel, Laurinda, for the stage.

Bibliography

Books
Unpolished Gem. (Black Inc., 2006)
Growing Up Asian in Australia (Black Inc., 2008) (editor)
 
 Laurinda (Penguin Australia, 2014) (published as Lucy and Linh in the United States, 2016)
Our Australian Girl: Meet Marly: Our Australian Girl, illustrated by Lucia Masciullo (Puffin, 2015)
Our Australian Girl: Marly's Business, illustrated by Lucia Masciullo (Puffin, 2015)
Our Australian Girl: Marly and the Goat, illustrated by Lucia Masciullo (Puffin, 2015)
Our Australian Girl: Marly Walks on the Moon, illustrated by Lucia Masciullo (Puffin, 2016)
My First Lesson: Stories Inspired by Laurinda (2016)
John Marsden: Writers on Writers (2017)
Close to Home (Black Inc., 2018)
One Hundred Days (Black Inc., 2021)

Articles
"A sacrifice shouldered, a loyalty pledged beyond words", 30 September 2007 The Age
"Shunned in a strange land, we should offer them more" 17 August 2008 The Age
"It's time to embrace the 'f' word" 28 October 2008 The Age
Living With Racism in Australia, 7 December 2016 The New York Times

Critical studies and reviews of Pung's work
Her Father's Daughter (2011)

 
 Brewster, Anne (2017) Remembering Violence in Alice Pung’s Her Father’s Daughter: The Postmemoir and Diasporisation, Life Writing, 14:3, 313-325, DOI: 10.1080/14484528.2017.1328298

Growing Up Asian in Australia (editor, 2008)

 Graham, Pamela (2013) Alice Pung's Growing up Asian in Australia: The Cultural Work of Anthologized Asian-Australian Narratives of Childhood, Prose Studies, 35:1, 67-83, DOI: 10.1080/01440357.2013.781412

Unpolished Gem (2006)

 Ommundsen, Wenche (2010) Writing as Cultural Negotiation: Suneeta Peres da Costa and Alice Pung. In: Collett A., D’Arcens L. (eds) The Unsociable Sociability of Women’s Lifewriting. Palgrave Macmillan, London.
 D'Arcangelo, Adele. (2014) Unpolished Gem/Gemma impura the Journey from Australia to Italy of Alice Pung’s Bestselling Novel. Journal of the Association for the Study of Australian Literature, [S.l.], v. 14, n. 1, june. ISSN 1833-6027. Available at: https://openjournals.library.sydney.edu.au/index.php/JASAL/article/view/9877.

Awards and recognition
In the 2022 Australia Day Honours Pung was awarded the Medal of the Order of Australia for service to literature.

Unpolished Gem
 Winner of the Australian Newcomer of the Year award in the 2007 Australian Book Industry Awards
 Shortlisted in the Australian Biography of the Year and Australian Book of the Year in the 2007 Australian Book Industry Awards
 Shortlisted in the 2007 New South Wales Premier's Literary Awards
 Shortlisted in the 2007 Victorian Premier's Literary Awards
 Shortlisted in the 2007 The Age Book of the Year Awards
 Shortlisted for the 2006 Colin Roderick Award
 Shortlisted for the 2007 The Westfield/Waverley Library Award for Literature

Her Father's Daughter
 Winner of the Non-Fiction Prize in the 2011 Western Australian Book Awards
 Shortlisted in the 2012 Victorian Premier's Literary Awards
Shortlisted in the 2012 NSW Premier's Literary Awards
Shortlisted in the 2012 Queensland Literary Awards

Laurinda
 2016 Ethel Turner Prize for Young People's Literature (NSW Premier's Literary Awards)

One Hundred Days 

 Shortlisted in the 2022 Miles Franklin Award
 Shortlisted for the 2022 Voss Literary Prize

References

External links

Alice Pung, Conversations with Richard Fidler (5 November 2014)
Tips on writing video
Alice Pung talks about her works

1981 births
Living people
Australian memoirists
Australian women novelists
Recipients of the Medal of the Order of Australia
Australian people of Chinese descent
Australian solicitors
Australian women lawyers
International Writing Program alumni
Australian women memoirists
Writers from Melbourne
People educated at Penleigh and Essendon Grammar School
People from Braybrook, Victoria
People educated at Mac.Robertson Girls' High School